The Asian V8 Championship Series (AV8C) was a motorsports competition for stock car race drivers from the Asia-Pacific. The only edition of the racing series took place in 2014, over two events at the Clark International Speedway in Pampanga and the Batangas Racing Circuit in Batangas, both in the Philippines. The tournament was organized by the Philippine Formula Autosports Foundation and was intended to set the Philippines as a hub for NASCAR racing in Asia. The overall winner of the tournament will compete at the NASCAR Whelen Series and in the K&N Pro NASCAR Series.

Participants

Schedule

Race winners

References

Stock car racing series
Recurring sporting events established in 2014
Motorsport in the Philippines